Boletin is an abandoned village in the municipality of Mavrovo and Rostuša, North Macedonia.

History
Due to uprisings in the Upper Reka region, Boletin was burned down by Serbian and Bulgarian forces between 1912–1916.

Demographics
Boletin (Nulitin) is attested in the Ottoman defter of 1467 as a village in the ziamet of Reka which was under the authority of Karagöz Bey. The village had a total of five households and the anthroponyms recorded depict an exclusively Albanian character: Orogan Reçi, Kolë Reçi, Progon Sunda, Kola son of Budin, and Kolë Reçi.  
 
The village when inhabited in past times had a Muslim Macedonian (Torbeš) population.

According to the 2002 census, the village had a total of 0 inhabitants.

References

Sources
 

Villages in Mavrovo and Rostuša Municipality
Macedonian Muslim villages